{{safesubst:#invoke:RfD||2=White Points|month = January
|day = 20
|year = 2023
|time = 11:44
|timestamp = 20230120114451

|content=
REDIRECT Newfoundland and Labrador

}}